The Carnegie Library in Boulder, Colorado is a building from 1906. It was listed on the National Register of Historic Places in 1979. The building is now known as the Carnegie Library for Local History, and is a branch of the Boulder Public Library.

References

External links
 Carnegie Library for Local History

Library buildings completed in 1906
Neoclassical architecture in Colorado
Libraries on the National Register of Historic Places in Colorado
Buildings and structures in Boulder, Colorado
Education in Boulder County, Colorado
Carnegie libraries in Colorado
Public libraries in Colorado
National Register of Historic Places in Boulder County, Colorado
1906 establishments in Colorado